Gary O'Toole, M.D.,  is a retired Irish Olympic swimmer. He represented Ireland at the Seoul, and Barcelona Games.

While studying at University College Dublin, O'Toole won a 200 m breaststroke silver medal at the 1989 European Long Course Championships in Bonn .  He also won a gold medal at the World University Championships in 1991 when representing University College Dublin and UCD.  He helped to break 5 National relay records, including Short Course and Longcourse.

As a prominent member of the Irish Amateur Swimming Association, O'Toole had been approached to make representations on behalf of the victims of the George Gibney scandal. Gibney, who coached O'Toole until he became aware of these allegations, criticised O'Toole publicly during the 1992 Olympics. His complaints were ignored, and led to a major investigation into the incidents and ultimately to the disbandment of the IASA, and the creation of Swim Ireland.

Since his retirement from professional swimming, O'Toole has been a practising Orthopedic surgeon with a specialist interest in adult arthritis (both hip and knee) and knee sports injuries. He also has a keen interest in musculoskeletal cancer (bone and soft tissue tumours). He continued to provide expert analysis for RTÉ Sport's Olympic swimming coverage.

References

1968 births
Living people
Swimmers at the 1988 Summer Olympics
Swimmers at the 1992 Summer Olympics
Olympic swimmers of Ireland
Irish orthopaedic surgeons
Alumni of University College Dublin
People from Bray, County Wicklow
Sportspeople from County Wicklow
European Aquatics Championships medalists in swimming
Irish male swimmers
Universiade medalists in swimming
Universiade gold medalists for Ireland
Medalists at the 1991 Summer Universiade
People educated at Presentation College, Bray